Karina Nicole Wieland (born 2 September 1974) is an Australian rower. She competed in the women's eight event at the 1996 Summer Olympics.

References

External links
 

1974 births
Living people
Australian female rowers
Olympic rowers of Australia
Rowers at the 1996 Summer Olympics
Sportspeople from Geelong
20th-century Australian women